This is a list of schools in Estonia.

Harju County

Tallinn
Audentes School (IB DP)
Audentes Sport Gymnasium (established in 2000)
EBS Gümnaasium (EBS High School)
Elfriede Lender Private Gymnasium (Elfriede Lenderi Eragümnaasium; 1907–1940)
Haabersti Vene Gümnaasium
International Elementary School of Estonia
Jakob Westholmi Gümnaasium (Jakob Westholm Gymnasium, Jakob Westholm Grammar School)
Kaarli Gymnasium
Karjamaa Gümnaasium
Kivimurru Gümnaasium
Pelgulinna Gümnaasium (Pelgulinna Gymnasium)
Pelguranna Gümnaasium
Secondary Science School of Tallinn (Tallinn 2. Secondary School, Tallinn Secondary Science School)
Tallinn School No. 21 (Tallinna 21. Kool)
Tallinna 32. Keskkool 
Tallinna Arte Gümnaasium 
Tallinna Audentese Erakool 
Tallinn European School (Tallinna Euroopa Kool)
Gustav Adolf Grammar School (Gustav Adolfi Gümnaasium)
Tallinna Humanitaargümnaasium
Tallinn English College (Tallinna Inglise Kolledž)
Tallinna Järveotsa Gümnaasium
Tallinn Jewish School (Tallinna Juudi Kool)
Tallinna Kadrioru Saksa Gümnaasium 
Tallinna Kesklinna Vene Gümnaasium 
Tallinna Kristiine Gümnaasium
Tallinna Kunstigümnaasium (Tallinn Art Gymnasium)
Tallinna Kuristiku Gümnaasium 
Tallinna Laagna Gümnaasium 
Tallinna Lasnamäe Gümnaasium 
Tallinn Lasnamae Russian School (Tallinna Lasnamäe Vene Gümnaasium)
Tallinna Lasnamäe Üldgümnaasium 
Tallinna Liivalaia Gümnaasium 
Tallinna Lilleküla Gümnaasium 
Tallinna Linnamäe Vene Lütseum 
Tallinna Läänemere Gümnaasium
Tallinn Mustamäe Secondary School (Tallinna Mustamäe Gümnaasium)
Tallinna Mustamäe Humanitaargümnaasium 
Tallinna Mustamäe Reaalgümnaasium
Tallinna Mustjõe Gümnaasium 
Tallinna Muusikakeskkool 
Tallinna Nõmme Gümnaasium 
Tallinna Pae Gümnaasium 
Tallinna Paekaare Gümnaasium 
Tallinna Pirita Majandusgümnaasium (or Pirita Gymnasium of Economics)
Tallinn French Lyceum (Tallinna Prantsuse Lütseum)
Tallinna Pääsküla Gümnaasium 
Tallinna Reaalkool 
Tallinna Rocca al Mare Kool Era-üldhariduskool 
Tallinna Saksa Gümnaasium 
Tallinna Sikupilli Keskkool 
Tallinna Sõle Gümnaasium 
Tallinna Tehnikagümnaasium (earlier name 43rd Secondary School of Tallinn)
Tallinna Tõnismäe Reaalkool 
Tallinna Täiskasvanute Gümnaasium 
Tallinna Vaba Waldorfkool 
Tallinna Valdeku Gümnaasium (Tallinn Valdeku Gymnasium, earlier name 30th High School of Tallinn)
Tallinna Vanalinna Hariduskolleegium 
Tallinna Vanalinna Täiskasvanute Gümnaasium (Tallinn's Old Town School for Adults)
Tallinna Järveotsa Gümnaasium 
Tallinna Õismäe Humanitaargümnaasium 
Tallinna Õismäe Vene Lütseum 
Tallinna Ühisgümnaasium (Tallinn Coeducational Gymnasium)
Sakala Eragümnaasium
Vana-Kalamaja Täiskasvanute Gümnaasium

Other Harju County
Aegviidu Põhikool
Ardu Kool
Aruküla Basic School (Aruküla Põhikool) 
Aruküla Vaba Waldorfkool
Harkujärve Põhikool
Harjumaa Folk University
Harmi Põhikool
Jüri Gümnaasium
Kallavere Keskkool
Kehra Keskkool
Keila Gümnaasium
Kernu Põhikool
Kiili Gümnaasium
Kolga Keskkool
Kose Gümnaasium
Kostivere Põhikool
Kurtna Kool
Kuusalu Keskkool
Lagedi Põhikool
Loksa Gümnaasium
Loksa Russian Gymnasium
Loksa 2. Secondary School
Loksa 1. Secondary School
Loo Keskkool
Nissi Põhikool
Oru Põhikool
Padise Põhikool
Paldiski Gümnaasium
Paldiski Vene Gümnaasium
Pikavere kool
Prangli Põhikool
Püünsi Põhikool
Raasiku Põhikool
Risti Põhikool
Ruila Põhikool
Saku Gümnaasium
Saue Gümnaasium (or Saue Gymnasium)
Tabasalu Ühisgümnaasium
Turba Gümnaasium
Viimsi Keskkool (Viimsi School)
Peetri Lasteaed-Põhikool

Hiiu County
Käina Gümnaasium
Kärdla Ühisgümnaasium
Palade Põhikool
Emmaste Põhikool

Ida-Viru County
Ahtme Gümnaasium
Aseri Keskkool
Avinurme Gümnaasium
Iisaku Gümnaasium
Illuka Põhikool
Jõhvi Gümnaasium
Jõhvi Vene Gümnaasium
Kiviõli I Keskkool
Kohtla Põhikool
Kohtla-Järve Järve Gümnaasium
Kohtla-Järve Ühisgümnaasium
Lüganuse Keskkool
Maidla Põhikool
Mäetaguse Põhikool
Narva 6. Kool
Narva Eesti Gümnaasium
Narva Joala Kool (closed)
Narva Humanitaargümnaasium
Narva Kesklinna Gümnaasium
Narva Paju Kool
Narva Pähklimäe Gümnaasium
Narva Soldino Gümnaasium
Narva Vanalinna Riigikool
Sillamäe Kannuka Kool
Tammiku Gümnaasium
Toila Gümnaasium

Jõgeva County
Adavere Põhikool
Jõgeva Gümnaasium
Jõgeva Täiskasvanute Keskkool
Jõgeva Ühisgümnaasium
Laiuse Põhikool
Lustivere Põhikool
J.V. Veski nim. Maarja Põhikool
Mustvee Gümnaasium
Oskar Lutsu Palamuse Gümnaasium
Puurmani Keskkool
Põltsamaa Ühisgümnaasium
Tabivere Gümnaasium
Carl Robert Jakobsoni nim. Torma Põhikool

Järva County
Albu Põhikool
Ambla Põhikool
Aravete keskkool
Imavere Põhikool
Järva-Jaani Gümnaasium
Kabala Põhikool
Koeru Keskkool
Koigi Põhikool
Laupa Põhikool
Paide Hammerbecki Põhikool (Paide Hammerbeck Secondary School)
Paide Gümnaasium
Peetri Kool
Retla Kool
Roosna-Alliku Põhikool
Türi Põhikool
Türi Ühisgümnaasium

Lääne County
Haapsalu Gümnaasium
Haapsalu Nikolai Kool
Haapsalu Täiskasvanute Gümnaasium
Haapsalu Wiedemanni Gümnaasium
Kullamaa keskkool
Lihula Gümnaasium
Martna Põhikool
Noarootsi Gümnaasium
Noarootsi Kool
Nõva Põhikool
Oru Kool
Ridala Põhikool
Risti Põhikool
Taebla Gümnaasium

Lääne-Viru County
Aaspere Põhikool
Aluvere Põhikool
Haljala Gümnaasium
Jäneda Põhikool
Kadrina Keskkool
Kiltsi Põhikool
Koeru Keskkool
Kunda Ühisgümnaasium
Laekvere Põhikool
Lasila Põhikool
Lehtse Põhikool
Muuga Põhikool
Rakke Gümnaasium
Rakvere Eragümnaasium
Rakvere Gümnaasium
Rakvere Põhikool
Rakvere Reaalgümnaasium
Rakvere Õhtukeskkool
Ferdinand von Wrangell'i nim. Roela Põhikool
Tamsalu Gümnaasium
Tapa Gümnaasium
Tapa Vene Gümnaasium
Vinni-Pajusti Gümnaasium
Väike-Maarja Gümnaasium

Põlva County
Fr. Tuglase nim. Ahja Keskkool (or Ahja Keskkool)
Johannese Kool Rosmal
Kanepi Gümnaasium
Kauksi Põhikool
Krootuse Põhikool
Mikitamäe Põhikool
Mooste Põhikool
Orava Põhikool
Põlva Keskkool
Põlva Ühisgümnaasium
Ruusa Põhikool
Räpina Ühisgümnaasium (Räpina High School)

Pärnu County
Are Põhikool
Audru Keskkool
Häädemeeste Keskkool
Jõõpre Põhikool
Kihnu School
Kilingi-Nõmme Gümnaasium
Koonga Põhikool
Metsapoole Põhikool
Paikuse Põhikool
Pärnjõe Põhikool
Pärnu Hansagümnaasium
Pärnu Koidula Gümnaasium (Koidula Gymnasium)
Pärnu Kuninga Tänava Põhikool
Pärnu Raeküla Kool
Pärnu Rääma Põhikool
Pärnu Sütevaka Humanitaargümnaasium
Pärnu Täiskasvanute Gümnaasium
Pärnu Vanalinna Põhikool
Pärnu Vene Gümnaasium
Pärnu Ühisgümnaasium
Pärnu Ülejõe Gümnaasium
Pärnu-Jaagupi Gümnaasium
Sindi Gümnaasium
Tõstamaa Secondary School (Tõstamaa Keskkool) 
Vändra Gümnaasium

Rapla County
Eidapere Põhikool
Hagudi Põhikool
Haimre Põhikool
E. Vilde nim. Juuru Gümnaasium
Järvakandi Gümnaasium
Kabala Lasteaed-Põhikool
Kaiu Põhikool
Kehtna Põhikool
Kivi-Vigala Põhikool
Kodila Põhikool
Kohila Gümnaasium
Käru Põhikool
Märjamaa Gümnaasium
Rapla Vesiroosi Kool
Rapla Täiskasvanute Gümnaasium
Rapla Ühisgümnaasium (Rapla Secondary School)

Saare County
Aste Põhikool
Kaali Põhikool
Kaarma Põhikool
Kahtla Põhikool
Kihelkonna Põhikool
Kuressaare Gümnaasium (Kuressaare Gymnasium)
Kuressaare Põhikool
Kuressaare Täiskasvanute Gümnaasium
Kuressaare Vanalinna Kool
Kärla Põhikool
Leisi Keskkool
Lümanda Põhikool
Muhu Põhikool
Mustjala Põhikool
Orissaare Gümnaasium
Ruhnu Põhikool
Saaremaa Ühisgümnaasium
Tornimäe Põhikool

Tartu County

Tartu
Tartu Annelinna Gümnaasium
Tartu Audentese Erakool
Tartu Descartes'i Kool (or Tartu Descartes Lyceum or Tartu Descartes School)
Tartu Forseliuse Gümnaasium (Tartu Forselius School)
Tartu Hugo Treffneri Gümnaasium
Tartu Karlova Gümnaasium
Tartu Katoliku Kool
Tartu Kivilinna Gümnaasium (Tartu Kivilinna School)
Tartu Hansa Kool (Tartu Hansa School)
Tartu Kunstigümnaasium
Tartu Mart Reiniku Gümnaasium
Tartu Miina Härma Gümnaasium
Tartu Jaak Petersoni Gymnasium
Tartu Jaan Poska Gymnasium (Jaan Poska Gymnasium)
Tartu Pushkini Gümnaasium 
Tartu Raatuse Gümnaasium
Tartu Reaalkool
Tartu Tamme Gümnaasium (Tartu Tamme Gymnasium)
Tartu Täiskasvanute Gümnaasium
Tartu Vene Lütseum (Tartu Vene Lyceum)
Tartu Waldorfgümnaasium

Other Tartu County
Anna Haava nim. Pala Kool (A. Haava Pala Basic School, Pala Comprehensive School)
Juhan Liivi nimeline Alatskivi Kool
Elva Gümnaasium
Ilmatsalu Põhikool
Kallaste Keskkool
Kambja Ignatsi Jaagu Põhikool
Kuuste Kool
Kõrveküla Põhikool
Laeva kool
Luunja Keskkool
Lähte Ühisgümnaasium
Mehikoorma Põhikool
Nõo Põhikool
Nõo Reaalgümnaasium (Nõo Gymnasium)
Puhja Gümnaasium
Rannu Keskkool
Rõngu Keskkool
Võnnu Keskkool
Ülenurme Gümnaasium

Valga County
Ala Põhikool
Hummuli Põhikool
Keeni Põhikool
Lüllemäe Põhikool
Otepää Gümnaasium
Palupera Põhikool
Puka Keskkool
Pühajärve Põhikool
Tsirguliina Keskkool
Tõrva Gümnaasium (Tõrva Gymnasium)
Valga Gümnaasium (Valga Gymnasium, Valga City Gymnasium)
Valga Kaugõppegümnaasium
Valga Vene Gümnaasium

Viljandi County
Abja Gümnaasium
Halliste Põhikool
Kalmetu Põhikool
August Kitzbergi nim. Karksi-Nuia Gümnaasium
Kildu Põhikool
Kirivere Põhikool
Kolga-Jaani Põhikool
Kõpu Põhikool
Kärstna Põhikool
Leie Põhikool
Mõisaküla Keskkool
Olustvere Põhikool
Paistu Põhikool
Raudna Põhikool
Suure-Jaani Gümnaasium
Tarvastu Gümnaasium
Viljandi Jakobsoni Kool
Viljandi Kesklinna Kool
Viljandi Paalalinna Gümnaasium
Viljandi Täiskasvanute Gümnaasium
Viljandi Vene Gümnaasium 
Võhma Gümnaasium

Võru County
Antsla Gümnaasium (Antsla Gymnasium)
Haanja-Ruusmäe Põhikool
Krabi Põhikool
Kuldre Põhikool
Kääpa Põhikool
Lepistu Põhikool (closed in 2008)
Meremäe-Obinitsa Põhikool (Incomplete Secondary School of Obinitsa)
Misso Keskkool
Mõniste Põhikool
Osula Põhikool
Parksepa Keskkool
Pikakannu Põhikool
Puiga Põhikool
Rõuge Põhikool
Varstu Keskkool (Varstu Secondary School)
Vastseliina Gümnaasium
Võru Kesklinna Gümnaasium
Võru Kreutzwaldi Kool
Võru Gümnaasium
Võru Täiskasvanute Gümnaasium

See also
List of universities in Estonia
List of music schools in Estonia

References 

 
Estonia
Schools
Schools
Schools
Estonia